Hamsa Geetham is a 1981 Indian Malayalam film, directed by I. V. Sasi. The film stars  Ratheesh, Balan K. Nair and Kuthiravattam Pappu in the lead roles. The film has musical score by Shyam.

Cast

Ratheesh
Seema
Balan K. Nair
Kuthiravattam Pappu
P. K. Abraham
Jayaprabha
Indrapani

Soundtrack
The music was composed by Shyam and the lyrics were written by Bichu Thirumala and Sathyan Anthikad.

References

External links
 

1981 films
1980s Malayalam-language films
Films directed by I. V. Sasi
Films with screenplays by T. Damodaran